1/3 or  may refer to:

Dates
January 3 (month-day date notation)
1 March (day-month date notation)
January of the year 3 AD (month-year date notation)
March of the year 1 AD (year-month date notation)

Other uses
, a fraction of one third, or 0.333333333... in decimal.
pre-decimal British sterling currency of 1 shilling and 3 pence
1st Battalion, 3rd Marines, United States infantry battalion
One/Three, a 2001 album

See also
Third (disambiguation)